Soloe tripunctata is a moth in the family Erebidae first described by Herbert Druce in 1896. It is found in Tanzania.

References

Zwier, Jaap "Soloe tripunctata Druce 1896". Aganainae.

Endemic fauna of Tanzania
Aganainae
Insects of Tanzania
Moths of Africa
Moths described in 1896